Vinarc i Poshtëm (in Albanian) or Donje Vinarce (in Serbian: Доње Винарце) is a village in the municipality of Mitrovica in the District of Mitrovica, Kosovo. According to the 2011 census, it has 959 inhabitants.

Demography 
According to the 2011 census, the village has in total 959 inhabitants, from whom 955 (99.58%) are Albanians and four (0,42%) Bosnian.

Notable Locations 

 Mitrovica Lake
 Olympic Stadium Adem Jashari

Notes

References 
{{reflist}}

Villages in Mitrovica, Kosovo